Hibbertia amplexicaulis is a species of flowering plant in the family Dilleniaceae and is endemic to Western Australia. It blooms between August and March producing yellow flowers. It was first formally described in 1845 by Ernst Gottlieb von Steudel in Lehmann's Plantae Preissianae. The specific epithet (amplexicaulis) means "stem-clasping", referring to the leaves.

This species is found throughout the Peel, southern Wheatbelt, South West and Great Southern regions of Western Australia in coastal areas, swamps and ridges where it grows in sandy lateritic or granitic soils, often over limestone.

See also
List of Hibbertia species

References

amplexicaulis
Flora of Western Australia
Plants described in 1845
Taxa named by Ernst Gottlieb von Steudel